Jeillo Edwards (23 September 1942, Freetown, Sierra Leone – 2 July 2004, London, England) was a Sierra Leonean actress, who is notable in the history of black actors in Britain.  She was the first woman of African descent to study drama at London's Guildhall School of Music and Drama.  She went on to be one of the first black actresses to be cast in a mainstream UK television drama series – Dixon of Dock Green, and for more than four decades performed on British television, radio, stage and films.

Biography
Jeillo Angela Doris Edwards was born in Freetown, Sierra Leone, one of six children, and she attended the Annie Walsh Memorial School.

She moved to England in the late 1950s and studied at the Guildhall School of Music and Drama.  She began performing at the age of four, reading from the Bible at her church.  She was well known for her distinctive voice and imperious enunciation.  She featured on the BBC World Service for Africa, which was broadcast in the UK.  She became popular in the United Kingdom, appearing on television, where she was the first black woman to appear on British television as well as being the first African to appear on The Bill, radio and on stage.

She appeared in cameo roles in many British television comedy programmes, including The Professionals, The League of Gentlemen, Absolutely Fabulous, Red Dwarf, Black Books, Spaced and Little Britain, in which she had been planned to appear in the second series before her death.

As well as acting she also at one time was a school governor and owned a restaurant called Auntie J's in Brixton.

In the early 1970s, she married a Ghanaian, Edmund Clottey, and they had a daughter and two sons.
Jeillo Edwards died in London at the age of 61, having suffered chronic kidney problems.

Actress

2003: Little Britain   .... Nurse (1 episode, 2003)
2003: Murder Investigation Team   .... Agnes Welsh (1 episode, 2003)
2003: Murder in Mind   .... Phyllis (1 episode, 2003)
2002: Dirty Pretty Things   .... Hospital Cleaning Lady
2002: Anansi   .... Aunt Vera
2001: Absolutely Fabulous   .... Jeillo (1 episode, 2001)
2001: Sam's Game   .... Mumma (1 episode, 2001)
2001: Spaced   .... Tim's Benefit Clerk (1 episode, 2001)
2000: Black Books    .... Midwife (1 episode, 2000)
2000: The Thing About Vince   .... Mrs. Cuffy (2 episodes, 2000)
2000: The League of Gentlemen   .... Yvonne (1 episode, 2000)
2000: Tough Love   (TV) .... Irate Woman
1999: Red Dwarf   .... Second Ground Controller (1 episode, 1999)
1998: A Rather English Marriage   (TV) .... Sister
1998: Babes in the Wood   .... Nigerian Lady (1 episode, 1998)
1998: In Exile    .... Mother (1 episode, 1998)
1997: Holding On   .... Aunt Gaynor (5 episodes, 1997)
1997: Paris, Brixton   .... Landlady
1996: Beautiful Thing    .... Rose
1994: Pat and Margaret    (TV) .... Tea Bar Lady
1994: A Skirt Through History    .... Mary Prince (1 episode, 1994)
1993: The Line, the Cross & the Curve   .... Dancer 'Eat the Music'
1992: Screen One   .... Mrs. Jessop (1 episode, 1992)
1989: Sob Sisters    .... Woman with dog (1 episode, 1989)
1989: Casualty    .... Grandmother / ... (3 episodes, 1989–1997)
1988: Rumpole of the Bailey    .... Lady Cashier (1 episode, 1988)
1988: London's Burning    .... Mrs. Jones (1 episode, 1988)
1987: The Bill    .... Clarice Paine / Mary Mullen / Mrs Ambrose / Mrs Peake / Mrs Konchella / Mrs Keel / Woman at Counter (7 episodes, 1987–2000)
1987: Elphida   (TV) .... Somali woman
1987: Scoop    (TV) .... Mrs. Jackson
1985: Hammer House of Mystery and Suspense   .... Landlady (1 episode, 1985)
1983: Maybury    .... Mrs. Galsworthy (1 episode, 1983)
1982: Love Is Old, Love Is New   (TV) .... Ward maid
1981: Memoirs of a Survivor   .... Woman at Newsstand
1979: Empire Road   ... Mary O'Fili (1 episode, 1979)
1979: Room Service   TV series .... Mrs. McGregor (unknown episodes)
1978: The Professionals    .... West Indian Woman (1 episode, 1978)
1978: Betzi    (TV) .... Sarah
1976: Centre Play    .... Nurse (2 episodes, 1976–1977)
1975: Play for Today    .... Lucy / ... (2 episodes, 1975–1980)
1975: Angels    .... Mrs. Jobo (2 episodes, 1975–1980)
1972: Dixon of Dock Green''    .... Mrs. Morgan (1 episode, 1972)

References

External links
 

1942 births
2004 deaths
Alumni of the Guildhall School of Music and Drama
Sierra Leone Creole people
Sierra Leonean film actors
Sierra Leonean emigrants to the United Kingdom
Black British actresses
20th-century actresses
21st-century actresses
20th-century Sierra Leonean actors
21st-century Sierra Leonean actors
Sierra Leonean actresses
People from Freetown